TurboPrint is a closed source printer driver system for Linux, AmigaOS and MorphOS. It supports a number of printers that don't yet have a free driver, and fuller printer functionality on some printer models. In recent versions, it integrates with the CUPS printing system.

References

Notes
 Carla Schroder (December 16, 2009), TurboPrint for Linux Saves the Day-- Again, linuxplanet.com
 A. Lizard, (November 06, 2006) Turning SLED10 Linux Into a Practical User Desktop, Dr. Dobb's
  Michael Kofler, Jetzt lerne ich Linux im Büro: Office-Aufgaben einfach und sicher unter Linux meistern, Pearson Education, 2004, p. 95
  Andreas Proschofsky, Turboprint 2: Professionelle Linux-Drucker-Treiber in neuer Version, 8 July 2008, Der Standard
  Christian Verhille, Mandriva Linux 2007, pp. 278-280, Editions ENI, 2006, 
 Fulvio Peruggi (2007), TurboPrint 7.60 on MorphOS

Computer printing
Amiga software
Linux software
MorphOS
MorphOS software